Deerfield Township is a township in Vernon County, in the U.S. state of Missouri.

Deerfield Township was erected in 1855, and named after the abundance of deer in the area.

References

Townships in Missouri
Townships in Vernon County, Missouri